Lawless Valley is a 1932 American Western film directed by J.P. McGowan and starring Lane Chandler, Gertrude Messinger and Richard Cramer.

Cast
 Lane Chandler as Bob Rand
 Gertrude Messinger as Rosita 
 Richard Cramer as Bull Lemoyne
 J.P. McGowan as Big Mike Carter 
 Anne Howard as Minerva Huff
 Si Jenks as Zebb Huff

References

Bibliography
 Michael R. Pitts. Poverty Row Studios, 1929–1940: An Illustrated History of 55 Independent Film Companies, with a Filmography for Each. McFarland & Company, 2005.

External links
 

1932 films
1932 Western (genre) films
American Western (genre) films
Films directed by J. P. McGowan
American black-and-white films
1930s English-language films
1930s American films